Day Star (1875–1893) was the winner of the 4th annual Kentucky Derby held at Churchill Downs on May 21, 1878.  He was a chestnut colt that was foaled in Kentucky and was sired by Star Davis (by the successful Glencoe). His dam was Squeeze-'em who was sired by Lexington, a foundation sire of many modern Thoroughbred lineages.

Day Star won the Derby by two lengths in an official time of 2:37.25, beating the race record set by Aristides in 1875, and winning a total of $4,050.

In his career, he had 42 starts, 11 wins, 7 places and 5 shows.

A 1910 Daily Racing Form article states that Day Star was sold after his racing career and stood at stud on a western farm, dying at the age of 18 years in 1893.

Pedigree

References

1875 racehorse births
1893 racehorse deaths
Racehorses bred in Kentucky
Racehorses trained in the United States
Kentucky Derby winners
Thoroughbred family 4-m
Byerley Turk sire line